Trichy Road is an arterial road in Coimbatore, India. This road connects the city to Singanallur Bus Terminus and Sulur Air Force Station and the east and south-east suburbs in the Coimbatore metropolitan area. This road, along with Avinashi Road reveals Coimbatore's development, mostly along the eastern and western sides of these roads. It is considered to be one of the arterial roads with lesser traffic congestion.

Description
Coimbatore Junction is located at the road's western end. Trichy Road is the main gateway into the city by road from Southern and Eastern parts of Tamil Nadu such as Palladam, Dharapuram, Karur and Madurai. This road is a part of National Highways 81 (Coimbatore - Chidambaram Highway). It is maintained by the National Highways Authority of India. This road is a 23-km stretch running diagonally across the city in the East-West orientation, slightly moving along the South East tangent. Trichy road starts near the Coimbatore Medical College Hospital in Gopalapuram, and passes through the neighbourhoods of Singanallur, Ramanathapuram, Ondipudur, Chinthamanipudur, Sulur and finally Karanampettai.

Alignment

The road is a four lane road in most stretches except between Chinthamanipudur L&T Bypass Junction and Pappampatty Pirivu.

Flyovers

In Trichy Road, the Ondipudur Flyover overpassing the Irugur-Podanur railway line opened in 2007 and Trichy Road Flyover bypassing the Ramanathapuram and Sungam junctions is under construction. A four-lane flyover has been proposed at Singanallur, the most congested traffic junction on the road, to reduce traffic congestion.

Bus terminals

The Singanallur Bus Terminus is located along the road. The Sulur bus terminus, a suburban bus terminal, is located on the road, which is famous to be handled as temporary mofussil bus terminal of the city to handle festival rush..

Airforce Station 
Sulur Air Force Station, Coimbatore

Places 

Coimbatore Junction and Coimbatore Medical College Hospital Junction
LIC junction
Sungam junction
Ramanathapuram junction
Sowripalayam Pirivu 
Kallimadai junction
Coimbatore Boat House junction
Singanallur junction
Vasantha mills 
SIHS Colony road junction
Ondipudur Sungam Road junction
Ondipudur
Kathir Mills 
Irugur Pirivu 
Chinthamanipudur L&T Bypass Junction
Pappampatty Pirivu Junction
Ravathoor Pirivu 
Ranganathapuram
Sulur LIC junction
Sulur junction
Karanampettai junction

Landmarks 

Coimbatore Medical College Hospital  
LIC Divisional Office
Coimbatore Stock Exchange
Coimbatore City Boat House
Singanallur Farmers Market
Shanthi Social Services
Miraj Cinemas

Restaurants
Hotel Sri Surya  
Hotel Kandha
Kock Racko
Junior Kupannna
Canteen Savira
Absolute Biriyani

Hotels
Oceandrive Hotel

Parks and recreation 
SSS Park
Coimbatore City Boat House
Sulur Boat House

Educational institutions 
Kendria Vidyalaya School
Trinity Matric School
Alvernia Matric School
St.Josephs School
Air Force School
RVS College of Arts & Science
RVS School of Architecture
RVS College of Engineering and Technology

Other notable landmarks 
NGR Statue, Sungam
NGR Statue, Singanallur

Cinemas 

Miraj Cinemas- 5 Screens
Jaishanthi Theatre
Ambal Theatre (defunct)
Radharani Theatre (defunct)

Hospitals 
Kovai Medical Center Hospital (KMCH Sulur)
Saraswathi Hospital
Dr.Muthu's Hospital
Singanallur Corporation Health Care Centre
NG Hospital
ESI dispensary, Singanallur
Coimbatore Child Trust Hospital
VGM Hospital
Medwin Hospital
Deepam Hospital
Richmond Hospital
N.M. Hospital
Sri Bala Medical Centre Hospital
Masonic Medical Centre for Children
Coimbatore Medical College Hospital

Markets 
Farmers Market, Singanallur

References 

Central business districts in India
Roads in Coimbatore